Bert Edgar Chaplin [born as Bert Edgar Chapman] (September 25, 1893 – August 15, 1978) was a backup catcher in Major League Baseball. Chaplin batted left-handed and threw right-handed. He was born in Pelzer, South Carolina.

Chaplin was signed by the Boston Red Sox out of the University of South Carolina. In part of three seasons, he posted a .184 batting average (14-for-76) with seven RBI, 10 runs, two doubles, one triple, and two stolen bases without home runs in 35 games played.

Chaplin died in Sanford, Florida, at the age of 84.

External links

Retrosheet

1893 births
1978 deaths
Baseball players from South Carolina
Major League Baseball catchers
Boston Red Sox players
People from Pelzer, South Carolina